The Castle of Good Hope known locally as the Castle or Cape Town Castle is a bastion fort built in the 17th century in Cape Town, South Africa. Originally located on the coastline of Table Bay, following land reclamation the fort is now located inland. In 1936 the Castle was declared a historical monument (now a provincial heritage site) and following restorations in the 1980s it is considered the best preserved example of a Dutch East India Company fort.

History
Built by the Dutch East India Company between 1666 and 1679, the Castle is the oldest existing building in South Africa. It replaced an older fort called the Fort de Goede Hoop which was constructed from clay and timber and built by Jan van Riebeeck upon his arrival at the Cape of Good Hope in 1652. Two redoubts, Redoubt Kyckuit (Lookout) and Redoubt Duijnhoop (Duneheap) were built at the mouth of the Salt River in 1654. The purpose of the Dutch settlement in the Cape was to act as a replenishment station for ships passing the treacherous coast around the Cape on long voyages between the Netherlands and the Dutch East Indies (now Indonesia).

During 1664, tensions between Great Britain and the Netherlands rose amid rumours of war. That same year, Commander Zacharias Wagenaer, successor to Jan van Riebeeck, was instructed by Commissioner Isbrand Goske to build a pentagonal fortress out of stone. The first stone was laid on 2 January 1666. Work was interrupted frequently because the Dutch East India Company was reluctant to spend money on the project. On 26 April 1679, the five bastions were named after the main titles of William III of Orange-Nassau: Leerdam to the west, with Buuren, Katzenellenbogen, Nassau, and Oranje clockwise from it. The names of these bastions have been used as street names in suburbs in various provinces, but primarily of Cape Town, such as Stellenberg, Bellville .

In 1682 the gated entry replaced the old entrance, which had faced the sea. It was used to announce the time, as well as warning citizens in case of danger, since it could be heard 10 kilometres away. It was also rung to summon residents and soldiers when important announcements needed to be made.

The fortress housed a church, bakery, various workshops, living quarters, shops, and cells, among other facilities. The yellow paint on the walls was originally chosen because it lessened the effect of heat and the sun. A wall, built to protect citizens in case of an attack, divides the inner courtyard, which also houses the De Kat Balcony,  which was designed by Louis Michel Thibault with reliefs and sculptures by Anton Anreith. The original was built in 1695, but rebuilt in its current form between 1786 and 1790. From the balcony, announcements were made to soldiers, slaves and burghers of the Cape. The balcony leads to the William Fehr collection of paintings and antique furniture. It was briefly home to Lady Anne Barnard, after whom one of the Castle function rooms is named.

During the Second Boer War (1899–1902), part of the castle was used as a prison, and the former cells remain to this day. Fritz Joubert Duquesne, later known as the man who killed Kitchener and the leader of the Duquesne Spy Ring, was one of its more well-known residents. The walls of the castle were extremely thick, but night after night, Duquesne dug away the cement around the stones with an iron spoon. He nearly escaped one night, but a large stone slipped and pinned him in his tunnel. The next morning, a guard found him unconscious but alive.

In 1936, the Castle was declared an historical monument (from 1969 known as a national monument and since 1 April 2000 a provincial heritage site), the first site in South Africa to be so protected. Extensive restorations were completed during the 1980s making the Castle the best preserved example of a Dutch East India Company fort.

The Castle acted as local headquarters for the South African Army in the Western Cape, and today houses the Castle Military Museum and ceremonial facilities for the traditional Cape Regiments. The Castle is also the home of the Cape Town Highlanders Regiment, a mechanised infantry unit.

Symbolism
Prior to being replaced in 2003, the distinctive shape of the pentagonal castle was used on South African Defence Force flags, formed the basis of some rank insignia of major and above, and was used on South African Air Force aircraft.

Gallery

See also
 Fortifications of the Cape Peninsula
 History of Cape Colony Pre-1806
 Noon Gun
 List of castles and fortifications in South Africa
 House of Hope (fort)

Notes

References

Further reading
 
 Ras, A.C. (1959).  Die Kasteel en Ander Vroe Kaapse Vestingwerke. Tafelberg-Uitgewers

External links

 Official website
 Description on tourism website
 Castle of Good Hope on the Iziko Museums of Cape Town website
 Castle of Good Hope on the Fortified Places website
 

Castles in South Africa
Forts in South Africa
Buildings and structures completed in 1679
Buildings and structures in Cape Town
History of Cape Town
Maritime history of South Africa
Military history of South Africa
National symbols of South Africa
Tourist attractions in Cape Town
Historic sites in South Africa
South African heritage sites
1679 establishments in the Dutch Empire
Former properties of the Dutch East India Company
Buildings and structures associated with the Dutch East India Company
Reportedly haunted locations in South Africa